Connie Lam So-wai (born 31 December 1987) is a Hong Kong politician of the Professional Power who is the elected Legislative Council member for New Territories South East.

Personal life 
In September 2022, Lam tested positive for COVID-19.

Electoral history

References 

Living people
HK LegCo Members 2022–2025
Hong Kong pro-Beijing politicians
1987 births